Faxonius bisectus, the Crittenden Crayfish is a species of crayfish in the family Cambaridae. It is endemic to Kentucky.

References

External links

Cambaridae
Endemic fauna of Kentucky
Freshwater crustaceans of North America
Crustaceans described in 1944
Taxobox binomials not recognized by IUCN